, also  or Mount Kunimi (Kunimi-yama), is a  mountain situated on the border of Isehara, Hadano and Atsugi in Kanagawa Prefecture, Japan. Together with Mount Tanzawa and other mountains in the Tanzawa Mountains it forms the Tanzawa-Ōyama Quasi-National Park. Mount Ōyama is a popular sightseeing spot in Kanagawa Prefecture.

Geology

The mountain is made from non-alkali mafic rock. The rock is 7-15 million years old. The rock was extruded on the sea floor during the Neogene and then pushed up and onto the island of Honshu when the Izu–Bonin–Mariana Arc collided with the rest of Japan.

Holy mountain
Mount Ōyama has long been regarded as a holy mountain and object of worship. Religiously motivated mountain climbing has been practiced since the Hōreki era (1751–1764) and the various paths leading there were called . Today this name survives as the pseudonym of Route 246.

Afuri refers to the high amount of rain and clouds associated with the mountain. Farmers pray at Ōyama-Afuri Shrine to Suijin, god of rain.

The mountain is also known as the Guardian of the Land (Kunimi-yama).

Sightseeing

A bus connects Isehara Station on the Odakyu Odawara Line with the cable car station at the foot of the mountain. A narrow road runs directly between the town areas and the cable car station.  The cable car starts from next to Ōyama-dera and climbs to the top station. The top station is not far from the lower Afuri Shrine. Hiking from there it takes about 1.5 hours to climb to the top of the mountain.

Tofu and spinning tops are well-known local products. The Ōyama Tofu Festival takes place every March. The Ōyama Mountain Climbing Marathon also takes place in March between Isehara Station and the lower shrine.

Photo gallery

References

Oyama, Mount
Isehara, Kanagawa
Hadano, Kanagawa
Atsugi, Kanagawa